Northeast Kings Education Centre (NKEC or Northeast Kings), is a high school that opened in September 2001. It is located on Bains Road in Canning, Nova Scotia.  

The school replaced the high schools of Kings County Academy in Kentville and Cornwallis District High School in Canning.

NKEC's students come from the Kentville, Canning, Halls Harbour, North Kentville, Scots Bay and Centreville areas of Kings County. The school provides public education for Grade 6 through to Grade 12 and is divided into a middle school (Grades 6-8) and a high school (Grades 9-12). Glooscap Elementary School and Aldershot Elementary School students begin attending NKEC in Grade 6, while students from Kings County Academy in Kentville begin with Grade 9. Northeast Kings Education Centre has the second largest student population of any public school in western Nova Scotia. There are approximately 900 students and 80 staff members in the school.

Facilities
The school has a large gymnasium that can be divided into two separate gyms which allows both the middle school and high school to use the facility simultaneously. The school also has a cafeteria, a "learning commons" area, and 50 classrooms and labs. There is also a stage that opens for viewing in the cafeteria or the gymnasium, as well as an outdoor stage with seating. The school also boasts a football field, a baseball diamond, two soccer fields, outdoor basketball courts, tennis courts, and a nearby ice rink (Glooscap Arena), all within walking distance of the school grounds.

Athletics
In athletics, the school offers badminton, basketball, cross country, football, golf, hockey, table tennis, track & field, cheerleading, softball, volleyball and soccer. NKEC has won provincial championships in badminton (multiple), girls and boys soccer (multiple), boys hockey (multiple), girls basketball, track and field, cross country, table tennis (multiple) and division 2 football (multiple). The majority of the school's athletic teams, clubs and committees are run by school staff members while a few teams are coached by community members.

Clubs
There are many extra-curricular opportunities available for students at Northeast Kings. Students can get involved with the Improv Club which attends the Nova Scotia High School Drama Festival each year. The Ready, Set, Cook! team provides students with an opportunity to learn about food handling, cooking, and eventually compete in a culinary arts competition. NKEC's Youth in Action group organizes fundraising campaigns each year to help support global causes, including the construction of a school in Sierra Leone. 

Many other special-interest activities are available for students including Environmental Club, Dance Committee, Students' Council, TADD (Teens Against Drunk Driving), Yearbook Committee, Youth in Action, Citizenship Committee, Leadership Committee, Chess Club, Ambassadors, and much more.

Music
NKEC has a successful music program, currently under the direction of Maggie Helms. The Senior Concert Band has won gold at the Annapolis Valley Music Festival in both 2012 and 2013, winning their category in 2013, which gave them the honour of performing in the Stars of the Festival concert.

Directors:

Ken Hassell: 2001-2011

Rebecca Knock: 2011-2012

Maggie Helms: 2012-present

Senior Concert Band MVP:

The award of Senior Concert Band MVP is a very distinguished honor, as it is voted on by the members of the Senior Concert Band themselves, and anyone who wins this award is very deserving of it.

Recipients:

Jonathan Hiseler: 2011, 2012

Ethan Anderson: 2013, 2014

Robyn Gale: 2015

Nathan McNally: 2016

Noah Archibald, Nathan McNally: 2017

Samuel McNally: 2018

Courses
NKEC offers a wide variety of courses for its senior high students;
Math Courses 
Math Essentials 10, Mathematics At Work 10, Mathematics 10, Math Essentials 11, Mathematics At Work 11, Mathematics 11, Pre-Calculus 11, Math Essentials 12, Mathematics At Work 12, Mathematics 12, Pre-Calculus 12, Calculus 12
English Courses 
English 10 With Support, English 10 Plus, English 10, English Communications 11, English 11, Advanced English 11, English Communications 12, English 12, Advanced English 12
Science Courses 
Science 10 With Support, Science 10, Oceans 11, Agriculture 11, Human Biology 11, Biology 11, Chemistry 11, Physics 11, Biology 12, Chemistry 12, Physics 12
Social Studies Courses 
History 10, Geography 10, Geography 11, European History 11, Canadian History 11, African Canadian Studies 11, Mi'kmaw Studies 11, Global Politics 12, Global Geography 12, Global History 12, Psychology 12, Sociology 12, Law 12
Technology Courses 
Food Tech/Food Prep 10, Exploring Technology 10, Construction Technology 10, Skilled Trades 10, Applied Networking Technology 11, Business Technology 11, Design 11, Energy, Power and Transportation 11, Housing And Design 12, Film and Video Production 12, Computer Programming 12, Multimedia 12, Textile Technology 12, Production Technology 12
Physical Education Courses 
Physical Education 10, Dance 11, Yoga 11, Fitness Leadership 11, Physical Education 12
Family Studies Courses 
Food Tech/Food Prep 10, Child Studies 11, Canadian Families 12, Food Studies And Hospitality 12, Textile Technology 12
Art Courses 
Visual Arts 10, Drama 10, Music 10, Music Vocal 10, Visual Arts 11, Drama 11, Music 11, Music Vocal 11, Dance 11, Visual Arts 12, Drama Theatre Arts 12, Music 12, Music Vocal 12, Arts Entrepreneurship 12
Business Courses 
Career Development 10, Accounting 11, Business Technology 11, Co-operative Education 11, Economics 12, Entrepreneurship 12, Business Management 12, Co-operative Education 12
Core French and French Immersion Courses 
Core French 10, Francais Immersion 10, Arts Dramatiques 10, Histoire Ancienne et Med 10, Core French 11, Histoire du Canada 11, Mode de vie Actif 11, Core French 12, Historie Planetaire 12, Droit 12

Academics
NKEC offers a wide variety of academic opportunities for its students:
AP Capstone Program for grades 10 -12
French immersion for grades 9-12
Co-op 11 and 12 (community or Acadia University work placement)
Fine Arts Certificate
Career Access:The Career Access Program is a highly modified 3-year program which covers grades 10-12. Students enrolled in this program take core subjects with modifications to curriculum outcomes or Individual Program Planned (IPP) courses. Students receive important on-the-job training with local businesses through a Co-op component. An interview process demonstrating a need and a desire to be enrolled in this alternate program is required. Students in this program are focused on workplace employment following graduation.
Options and Opportunities (O-2): This program is developed for students who are capable of meeting regular curriculum outcomes, but may require an alternate pathway. This program also has an important Co-op component which provides opportunities for students to explore work related experiences through local businesses. An interview process demonstrating a need and a desire to be enrolled in this alternate program is required.
NKEC AP Capstone Program: AP courses are considered to be of equivalent to first year university level courses and can lead to a university credit if the student is successful in the course at an acquired standard. Currently NKEC offers AP Research, AP Seminar, AP Biology, AP Computer Programming, AP Psychology 12, AP Chemistry, English Literature and Composition and Human Geography via the Internet during classes held outside normal school hours. 
Correspondence courses, challenge for credit, Nova Scotia Virtual School and Independent Study options are available for students.

See also
 List of schools in Nova Scotia

References

External links
Northeast Kings Education Centre
Northeast Kings Titans Football
Annapolis Valley Regional School Board
AVRSB Long Range Outlook
High schools in Nova Scotia